Kelowna—Lake Country (formerly known as Kelowna) is a federal electoral district in the province of British Columbia, Canada, that has been represented in the House of Commons of Canada since 1997.

History
This district was created as "Kelowna" electoral district in 1996 from a portion of Okanagan Centre riding.

In 2003, it was renamed "Kelowna—Lake Country".

The 2012 federal electoral boundaries redistribution concluded that the electoral boundaries of Kelowna—Lake Country should be adjusted, and a modified electoral district of the same name will be contested in future elections. The redefined Kelowna—Lake Country loses a portion of its current territory to the new district of Central Okanagan—Similkameen—Nicola. These new boundaries were legally defined in the 2013 representation order, which came into effect upon the call of the 42nd Canadian federal election, scheduled for 19 October 2015.

Demographics

Members of Parliament

Current Member of Parliament
The Member of Parliament is Tracy Gray. She unseated Liberal incumbent Stephen Fuhr in the 2019 federal election.

Election results

Kelowna—Lake Country, 2003–present

Kelowna, 1996–2003

See also
 List of Canadian federal electoral districts
 Past Canadian electoral districts

References

 Library of Parliament Riding Profile (1996–2003)
 Library of Parliament Riding Profile (2003–present)
 Campaign expense data from Elections Canada – 2008
 Expenditures - 2004
 Expenditures – 2000
 Expenditures – 1997

Notes

External links
 Website of the Parliament of Canada

British Columbia federal electoral districts
Lake Country
Politics of Kelowna